"I Got U" is a song by English record producer Duke Dumont, featuring fellow record producer Jax Jones. It was released as the second single from his forthcoming debut studio album on 16 March 2014. The song reached number-one in Ireland, the UK and on the US Dance Club Songs chart. It features on his EP EP1, which was released in North America. It also appears on the compilation album Now 87 and in the video game Forza Horizon 2.

Background and release
The song interpolates vocals from session singer Kelli-Leigh's performance of "My Love Is Your Love". Dumont was inspired by the original recording of that song by Whitney Houston, saying: "It's one of my favourite Whitney songs, especially the latter Whitney period."

In April 2014, Dumont explained his process of making the song:

It was released in the United Kingdom on 16 March 2014 on Blasé Boys Club and Virgin EMI Records. A remix EP was released on the same day containing remixes of the song by MK, Tensnake, Jonas Rathsman, Bondax and High Contrast.

Promotion
The song was first aired on Annie Mac's Radio 1 show on 6 December 2013. She replayed the record halfway through because she couldn't get enough of it.

Music video
A music video was created for the single and was directed by Rémy Cayuela. Starring the model and actor Rique and New Zealand model Kylee Tan, the video was released on 19 February 2014, and was filmed in Thailand in locations between Bangkok and Phuket. Critical reception for it was positive; Capital Xtra noted that the video contained "all the experiences you'd expect someone to have whilst travelling to that part of the globe, including beach parties, boat rides and bonfires". GQ  commended it for containing, in their words, "all the tropical trimmings: turquoise waters, infinity pools, freshly sliced watermelon, a beachside rave, bungee jumps, inquisitive monkeys and an abundance of models in neon two-pieces" and noted that its only drawback is that it caused cravings for coconut drinks, an extended holiday and a game of beach volleyball.

Critical reception
Critical reception for the single was overwhelmingly positive. Robert Copsey praised the track for containing "all the summertime essentials: steel drums, Balearic synths and a myriad of earworm hooks" and noted that its choice of sample was "brave" but "sensitive enough that the essence of the original isn't lost". He also commended the vocal delivery of Kelli Leigh, describing it as "at times ... hauntingly similar to Whitney's". Lacy Kelly said that the song created a "calming vibe with a low steady beat, weaving piano between steel drums and Kelli Leigh's beautiful voice". In addition, Beatsmedia.com's William Michael called it "perfect for those laid back Balearic moments. Containing a cool laid back vibe, sweet piano chords and calypso rhythms "I Got U" has summer vibes written all over it and it when that unmistakable Whitney vocal comes in that you know this is one special record indeed". Jamieson Cox of Pitchfork called the song, "a blast of sunlight and warm, humid air, flecks of steel drum, vocal samples, and a joyous, radiant vocal take."

Chart performance
It reached number 16 on Belgium's Ultratop charts and number 64 on the Netherlands' MegaCharts. However, the song performed the best in the United Kingdom, topping their Official Charts.

Track listing

Credits and personnel
Jerry Duplessis – songwriter
Wyclef Jean – songwriter
Adam Dyment – songwriter, producer, programming
Jax Jones (Timucin Aluo) – songwriter, producer, instruments, programming
Tommy Forrest – mixer
Hal Ritson – sample recreation producer, backing vocals
Kelli-Leigh Henry-Davila – lead vocals
Yolanda Quartey – backing vocals
Richard Adlam – backing vocals
Daniel Pearce – backing vocals

Credits adapted from "I Got U" CD single.

Charts and certifications

Weekly charts

Year-end charts

Certifications

|-

Release history

See also
 List of number-one dance singles of 2014 (US)

References

2014 songs
2014 singles
Duke Dumont songs
Jax Jones songs
UK Singles Chart number-one singles
Irish Singles Chart number-one singles
Virgin EMI Records singles
Songs written by Jax Jones
Songs written by Jerry Duplessis
Songs written by Wyclef Jean
Songs written by Duke Dumont
Song recordings produced by Jax Jones